Ruda  is a village in the administrative district of Gmina Rytwiany, within Staszów County, Świętokrzyskie Voivodeship, in south-central Poland.

The village has a population of  353.

Demography 
According to the 2002 Poland census, there were 340 people residing in Ruda village, of whom 49.7% were male and 50.3% were female. In the village, the population was spread out, with 27.1% under the age of 18, 31.8% from 18 to 44, 21.8% from 45 to 64, and 19.4% who were 65 years of age or older.
 Figure 1. Population pyramid of village in 2002 — by age group and sex

References

Villages in Staszów County